Barycholos pulcher is a species of frog in the family Strabomantidae. It is endemic to the Pacific lowlands of Ecuador, up to  asl.

Its natural habitat is tropical moist lowland forest. It can also live in secondary forest, provided that habitats with leaf-litter are available. This locally common species is threatened by habitat loss and pollution.

References

pulcher
Amphibians of Ecuador
Endemic fauna of Ecuador
Taxa named by George Albert Boulenger
Amphibians described in 1898
Taxonomy articles created by Polbot